Taiwanese whisky is whisky made in Taiwan. The most prominent Taiwanese whisky producer is the Kavalan Distillery. In 2015 the Kavalan Soloist Vinho Barrique was named the best single malt whisky in the world at the World Whiskies Awards. A significant whisky market, Taiwan is the third largest consumer of single malts in the world.

History

From the Japanese colonial period until 2002 the right to produce alcohol was a government monopoly held by the Taiwan Tobacco and Liquor Corporation. After liberalization in 2002 private distilleries began to spring up. Taiwanese whisky first gained prominence in 2011 when a Taiwanese whisky beat three Scotches and an English whisky at Scotland's Burns Night. In 2015 the Kavalan Soloist Vinho Barrique was named the best single malt whisky in the world at the World Whiskies Awards. Seeking to imitate Kavalan's success the government owned Taiwan Tobacco and Liquor Corporation who had long ago abandoned whisky production entered the market with the Omar brand.

Styles
As it is a young producer there is no standard style for Taiwanese whisky dictated either by law or tradition leaving producers free to experiment and innovate. Due to Taiwan's subtropical climate whisky matures two to three times as fast as it would in Scotland or Ireland. Taiwanese whisky often has notes of subtropical fruit and in general has a creamy character, however, there is quite a bit of variation.

As a market
Taiwan has a developed and sophisticated whisky market. Taiwan is the third largest market for single malt whisky after the US and France. Pernod Ricard has described the Taiwanese whisky market as “discerning and advanced” and has produced special edition whiskies for the Taiwanese market.

Taiwan is the only whisky market which drinks more single malt whisky than blended whisky.

In Taiwan whisky is largely served at banquets and is often brought from home. Up until the 1990s cognac was the drink of choice at banquets but it has been replaced by whisky and to a lesser extent grape wine as tastes expand. Whisky collecting has also become popular.

See also
 Outline of whisky
 Japanese whisky
 Australian whisky
 Indian whisky
 Agriculture in Taiwan
 Beer in Taiwan
 Taiwanese wine

References